César Gaudin (16 December 1944 – 26 May 2000) was a Puerto Rican weightlifter. He competed in the men's middle heavyweight event at the 1972 Summer Olympics.

References

External links
 

1944 births
2000 deaths
Puerto Rican male weightlifters
Olympic weightlifters of Puerto Rico
Weightlifters at the 1972 Summer Olympics
Place of birth missing